Marie-Thérèse Naessens (born 12 May 1939) is a Belgian former racing cyclist. She finished in second place in the Belgian National Road Race Championships in 1965.

References

External links

1939 births
Living people
Belgian female cyclists
Cyclists from East Flanders
People from Kruisem
20th-century Belgian women